Jasper—Edson was a federal electoral district in Alberta, Canada, that was represented in the House of Commons of Canada from 1935 to 1968.

This riding was created in 1933 from parts of Peace River riding. The electoral district was abolished in 1966 when it was redistributed into  Peace River, Pembina, Red Deer, Rocky Mountain and Wetaskiwin ridings.

Election results

See also 

 List of Canadian federal electoral districts
 Past Canadian electoral districts

External links
 

Former federal electoral districts of Alberta